Tony Caso (Anthony Caso) is an American 1980s pop/dance music recording artist and, later, actor.

Career 

Tony Caso began recording in the early 1980s, as Tony Caso and Salvation.  His first single, "I Want To Dance With You" (1981), was issued on Lam Records.  A second single, 'Hot Blooded Woman', was also issued in 1981.

Tony joined the Bobby O label in New York, recording in One Two Three and Waterfont Home.  He had a number of singles throughout the 1980s:

All The Love In My Heart - 1983 (O Records)
Take A Chance (On Me)    - 1984 (O Records)
Dancing in Heaven        - 1985 (Memo Records)
Motorcycle Madness       - 1986 (Eurobeat Records)
Desperate & Dangerous    - 1987 (Eurobeat Records)
Love Attack              - 1987 (Eurobeat Records)
Run To Me                - 1987 (Eurobeat Records)

In the mid 1980s Caso began moving from recording to acting.  He has appeared in numerous commercials, television shows and movies including the Sopranos and Goodfellas.

References 

Year of birth missing (living people)
Living people
American male pop singers